Mirian may refer to
Mirian (given name)
Tower of Mirian in Georgia
Shah Nazar-e Mirian, a village in Iran